Leandro Andrés Gioda (born 1 October 1984) is an Argentine footballer, currently playing for Nueva Chicago. His position is centre back.

Career 
Gioda started his career in 2004 at Lanús and was signed by Independiente in 2006. Gioda had unfortunate luck with injuries while at Independiente suffering two serious knee injuries. On 2 August 2009 Xerez CD signed the Argentine defender on loan from  Independiente for a season.

Gioda returned to Argentina joining newly promoted first division side Quilmes on loan for the 2010–11 season. He then returned to Spanish side Xerez for the second half of the 2010-2011 season.

He was signed in the 2012-13 season to Primera B Nacional side Douglas Haig.

References

External links
 
  
 Player profile at Football-Lineups
 

Living people
1984 births
People from Rosario Department
Argentine footballers
Argentine expatriate footballers
Argentine Primera División players
Primera Nacional players
Club Atlético Lanús footballers
Club Atlético Independiente footballers
Quilmes Atlético Club footballers
Club Atlético Douglas Haig players
La Liga players
Segunda División players
Xerez CD footballers
Expatriate footballers in Spain
Argentine expatriate sportspeople in Spain
Argentine people of Italian descent
Citizens of Italy through descent
Association football defenders
Nueva Chicago footballers
Sportspeople from Santa Fe Province